XHLJ-FM is a radio station on 105.7 FM in Lagos de Moreno, Jalisco, Mexico, also serving León, Guanajuato. It carries the national La Ke Buena format.

History
XELJ-AM 1030 received its concession on July 1, 1963 after signing on March 30 of the same year. It was owned by Radio Anunciadora de Lagos, S.A. The 250-watt daytimer increased its power to 1,000 watts by the 1980s, and in the 1990s, it drastically jumped to 20 kW day and 2 kW night. In 2008, the concessionaire changed to Radio Emisora Central, which is owned by Carlos Sánchez Silva and Luz del Carmen Cordova Villalobos.

It was authorized to move to FM in 2011. A power increase to 15 kW was authorized in 2018.

References

Radio stations in Jalisco